The Cranford Township Public Schools is a comprehensive public school district serving students in pre-Kindergarten through twelfth grade in Cranford in Union County, New Jersey, United States. The district is governed by a nine-member elected board of education.

As of the 2018–19 school year, the district, comprised of seven schools, had an enrollment of 3,853 students and 323.0 classroom teachers (on an FTE basis), for a student–teacher ratio of 11.9:1.

The district is classified by the New Jersey Department of Education as being in District Factor Group "I", the second-highest of eight groupings. District Factor Groups organize districts statewide to allow comparison by common socioeconomic characteristics of the local districts. From lowest socioeconomic status to highest, the categories are A, B, CD, DE, FG, GH, I and J.

Schools
Schools in the district (with 2018–19 enrollment data from the National Center for Education Statistics) are:
Elementary schools
Bloomingdale Avenue School with 255 students in grades K-2
Lourdes Murphy, Principal
Brookside Place School with 365 students in grades K-5
Michael Klimko, Principal
Hillside Avenue School with 702 students in grades K-8
Kevin Deacon, Principal
Livingston Avenue School with 251 students in grades 3-5
Cari Lopez, Principal
Orange Avenue School with 738 students in grades 3-8
Lori Lubieski-Hutmaker, Principal
Walnut Avenue School with 312 students in grades PreK-2
Celine McNally, Principal
High school
Cranford High School with 1,233 students in grades 9-12
Mark Cantagallo, Principal

The system's high school was the 49th-ranked public high school in New Jersey out of 339 schools statewide in New Jersey Monthly magazine's September 2014 cover story on the state's "Top Public High Schools", using a new ranking methodology, after having been ranked 51st in the state out of 328 schools in 2012. Cranford High School has a curriculum which has a strong push for technology in the schools, along with stressing service learning.  The high school is recognized for its work in service learning and for being a national school of character.  Cranford High School students are regularly admitted to some of the nation's top private and public universities, with over 90% of each graduating class going onto college.

Cranford has two public middle schools, Orange Avenue School and Hillside Avenue School, which are located on each end of the township and serve their local neighborhood.  Both also are elementary schools as well.  On the north side of Cranford, along with Orange Avenue, are two other elementary schools, Bloomingdale Avenue School and Brookside Place School. On the south side of the township, along with Hillside Avenue, are two other elementary schools, Walnut Avenue School and Livingston Avenue School.

Lincoln School, which is the home of the district's administrative offices, also houses the district's two alternative education programs, CAP and CAMP.

Awards and recognition
The district was selected as one of the top "100 Best Communities for Music Education in America 2005" by the American Music Conference.

Administration
Core members of the district's administration are:
Dr. Scott Rubin, Superintendent
Robert J. Carfagno, Business Administrator / Board Secretary

Board of education
The district's board of education, comprised of nine members, sets policy and oversees the fiscal and educational operation of the district through its administration. As a Type II school district, the board's trustees are elected directly by voters to serve three-year terms of office on a staggered basis, with three seats up for election each year held (since 2012) as part of the November general election. The board appoints a superintendent to oversee the day-to-day operation of the district.

Notable alumni
 William Sperry Beinecke (born 1914), founder of the Central Park Conservancy and former chairman of S&H Green Stamps.
 Carol Blazejowski (born 1956), member of Basketball Hall of Fame and 1974 Cranford High School graduate.
 Robert Ferro (1941–1988), Cranford High School alumnus and author whose work included a gay coming-of-age novel describing a fictionalized version of Cranford centered around the Rahway River.

References

External links
Cranford Township Public Schools

School Data for the Cranford Township Public Schools, National Center for Education Statistics

Cranford, New Jersey
New Jersey District Factor Group I
School districts in Union County, New Jersey